Euchromia aemulina is a moth of the subfamily Arctiinae. It was described by Arthur Gardiner Butler in 1877. It is found in New Guinea and more recently in Australia.

References

 Arctiidae genus list at Butterflies and Moths of the World of the Natural History Museum

Moths described in 1877
Euchromiina